Illingen is a municipality in Baden-Württemberg, Germany.

History
In 1504, the monastery was taken over by the Duchy of Württemberg, beginning a centuries-long association with Württemberg. This became the district of Maulbronn in 1934, to which the two towns were also assigned. When that district was dissolved in 1938, they were assigned to Vaihingen's district. In 1974, Illingen and Schützingen were joined into a single municipality.

Geography
The municipality (Gemeinde) of Illingen is located at the eastern edge of the Enzkreis district, within the state of Baden-Württemberg and Federal Republic of Germany. It covers an area of  that lies within the metropolitan areas of Karlsruhe and Pforzheim. The largest watercourses within the municipality are the Schmiebach and Metter rivers. The lowest elevation in the municipality,  NN, lies along the Schmie while the highest,  NN, is the top of the Burgberg in the west.

The geological makeup of Illingen varies by area. The south is composed of Keuper from the Stromberg's Keuperberg subregion. In and around the town of Illingen, this Keuper is covered by layers of loess and loam.

North of Schützingen is the Federally protected  nature reserve.

Coat of arms
The municipality of Illingen's coat of arms displays the historical coats of arms for the towns of Illingen and Schützingen. On the left is Schützingen's, displaying a red key upon a yellow field, and on the right is Illingen's, a red spear with a golden flag upon a blue field. The flag upon Illingen's dates to 1937 while Schützingen's key was associated with the township by the time of its documentation in the 1684 cartographic book .

References

Enzkreis
Württemberg